Alexander Hamberg (born August 4, 1985) is a Swedish former ice hockey goaltender. He made his Elitserien debut playing with AIK IF during the 2012–13 Elitserien season. He is currently assigned as goaltender coach for Väsby IK HK.

References

External links

1985 births
Living people
Swedish ice hockey goaltenders
AIK IF players